The Universal Military Simulator is a computer game developed by Rainbird Software in 1987 for the Macintosh, Tandy 4000, and IBM PC compatibles.  In 1988, both Atari ST, Amiga versions were released. The game was created by Ezra Sidran. The PC and Amiga versions were ported by Ed Isenberg. The game spawned two sequels: UMS II: Nations at War and The War College: Universal Military Simulator 3.

Gameplay
This computer wargame allows players to create armies and battlefields, using three-dimensional terrain to place features such as towns and hills. Players can explore historical confrontations such as Hastings, Gettysburg, Waterloo, Arbela, and Marston Moor.  The player can zoom in on specific units confronting one another to plan strategy. The player has the option to play against another human opponent.

Reception
According to designer Ezra Sidran, The Universal Military Simulator was a commercial success, with sales of "about 128,000 units".

M. Evan Brooks reviewed the game for Computer Gaming World, and stated that "Overall, UMS is impressive, but its flaws are apparent. If you are interested in creating your own battles, then UMS is highly recommended. On the other hand, if you desire to learn accurate lessons from military history, then UMS may be a shade too general."

The game was reviewed in 1988 in Dragon #137 by Hartley, Patricia, and Kirk Lesser in "The Role of Computers" column. The reviewers gave the game 4 out of 5 stars. In 1990 Computer Gaming World gave the game two-plus stars out of five, stating "A visual feast, but a playable desert, U.M.S. is incorrect on two counts—it is neither universal nor a simulator". The magazine cited as weaknesses the lack of navies, awkward user interface, and a Battle of Waterloo scenario that completely omitted the Prussians. In 1993 two surveys of wargames in the magazine gave it one-plus stars and two stars, respectively. A 1994 survey of wargames with modern settings gave the game two stars, reporting that the game designer offered "superb customer support" when the publisher did not.

In 1993 a bundle called "The Complete Universal Military Simulator" was released that included the original game, the "Nations at War" sequel, and a "Planet Editor" that let users design planets, weather systems, nations, AIs, event effects, and scenarios as well as unit types and armies. Reviewing the package in Amiga Format, Richard Jones gave it a rating of 74%, writing that it wasn't recommended for "frivolous gamers after a quick thrill", but "is a must for the serious war gamer."

Reviews
The Games Machine - Feb, 1988
ASM (Aktueller Software Markt) - Feb, 1988
Atari ST User - Mar, 1988
Computer Gaming World - Oct, 1990
Computer and Video Games - Dec, 1991
Casus Belli #45 (June 1988)
Isaac Asimov's Science Fiction Magazine v12 n12 (1988 12)

References

External links
The Universal Military Simulator at MobyGames
The Universal Military Simulator at GameSpot
The Universal Military Simulator at GameFAQs
Review in Antic
Review in Games International

1987 video games
Amiga games
Atari ST games
Classic Mac OS games
Computer wargames
DOS games
Turn-based strategy video games
Video games developed in the United Kingdom